A Windows accelerator was a type of Graphics processing unit for personal computers with additional acceleration features like 2D line-drawings, blitter, clipping, font caching, hardware cursor support, color expansion, linear addressing, and pattern, polygon and area fills. The functionality marketed for accelerating the Microsoft Windows operating system. These have been superseded by multipurpose GPUs which include acceleration for 3D graphics.

Most of the Windows accelerator video cards were 2D capable fixed function accelerators that got 2D drawing commands and pixel data sent from the CPU and the fixed function run the given command which resulted in a faster drawing of the window. The lessened burden on the CPU, combined with the smaller data stream needed for the required instructions, resulted in improved performance compared to dumb frame-buffer only based video-cards.

In the high-end professional area a price of several thousands of dollars, there were also coprocessor based video chipsets like the Texas Instrument TMS34020 available that had their own processor which allowed to offload some of the processing data from the CPU to the coprocessor the videocard.

To make use of these accelerator or coprocessor based video cards, a Windows Graphic driver for the specific video chipset was necessary.

See also 

 SVGA
 local bus
 windows 3.1

References

Graphics processing units